The Green Bay Road Historic District is located in Thiensville, Wisconsin.

History
Most of the buildings in the district were constructed between 1850 and 1900. The businesses in the area were largely designed to serve the needs of customers during the horse and buggy era. After the arrival of a railroad, an interurban and automobiles, the village's commercial center moved west. That area would become the Main Street Historic District. Additionally, a number of private homes were built in the district, most were designed in the Queen Anne architectural style.

References

Historic districts on the National Register of Historic Places in Wisconsin
Geography of Ozaukee County, Wisconsin
National Register of Historic Places in Ozaukee County, Wisconsin